The Slovenia national under-19 football team is the national under-19 football team of Slovenia and is controlled by the Football Association of Slovenia.

Players

Current squad
The following players were called up for the two friendly matches against Romania in November 2022.

Past squads

2009 UEFA European Under-19 Football Championship squad

See also 
 Slovenia national football team
 Slovenia national under-21 football team

References

External links
 Official website
 Soccerway profile

Under-19
European national under-19 association football teams
Football, Under-19